Johannes Thienemann (12 November 1863 – 12 April 1938) was a German ornithologist and pastor who established the Rossitten Bird Observatory, the world's first dedicated bird ringing station where he conducted research and popularized bird study.

Biography
Thienemann was born in Gangloffsömmern, in the Prussian Province of Saxony. His father August Wilhelm and his grandfather Georg August Wilhelm were both clergymen with an interest in ornithology. The grandfather collaborated with Christian Ludwig Brehm. Thienemann followed the family tradition and his early training was for joining the Christian ministry. He later worked as a teacher but found his vocation in ornithology, in particular the study of bird migration.  In 1901 he founded  the bird observatory on the Curonian Spit at Rossitten, East Prussia (now Rybachy, Kaliningrad Oblast, Russia). The location had been of interest from the late 1880s, when ornithologists took an interest in the birds migrating through the region. Thienemann first visited the area in July 1896. Kurt Flöricke, a trader in bird specimens had set up a local society of bird enthusiasts (Verein vergnügter Vogelfreunde) in 1890. Flöricke however moved out of the area separating from his wife who then married Thienemann. Flöricke was to become a fierce critic of the scientific work of Thienemann. Among Thienemann's attempts was to introduce artificial nest boxes to induce hole-nesting birds to take up residence. He also provided sparrow carcasses for tits to feed on in winter and attempted the use artificial floating nest islands for gulls and encouraged the control of foxes and other predators. In 1899 he learnt of the bird ringing project started by Hans Mortensen in Denmark and began ringing and colour marking birds. Some of his early experiments were on ringing crows since they tended to be shot by hunters and traditional "crow-catchers" who then reported the rings. Thienemann was criticized by Hermann Löns. Thienemann distributed rings to others in the region including wealthy land holders, zoologists and hunters, building up a large network of bird ringers. Thienemann gave talks around the region and collated ring recoveries in annual reports. Thienemann was also interested in bird flight, and conducted experiments on the altitude at which birds flew in collaboration with the balloonist Friedrich von Lucanus and the gliding pioneer, Ferdinand Schulz. After 1926 Thienemann reared young storks and released them with announcements on the local radio about them leading to widespread interest in birds and their migration. In 1910 he published on the patterns of their migration based on 35 storks. Thienemann was largely self taught but received a degree in zoology at the age of 45 and was appointed a professor at the University of Königsberg but he took little interest in traditional academics. Thienemann worked with formally trained ornithologists including Oskar Heinroth who served for a while as the official director of the observatory. Thienemann carried out his ornithological work for the rest of his life, though retiring as director of the observatory in 1929. He died at Rossitten in his 75th year.

Honours
Honours received by Thienemann include:
 Goethe Medal for Art and Science
 Honorary Membership of the Deutsche Ornithologen-Gesellschaft (German Ornithological Society)
 Corresponding Fellowship of the American Ornithologists' Union

Publications
Books authored by Thienemann include:
 1927 – Rossitten. Drei Jahrzehnte auf der kurischen Nehrung. Neumann: Neudamm. (In German)
 1931 – Vom Vogelzuge in Rossitten. Neumann: Neudamm. (In German)
 1935 – Von Elchen, Störchen, Krähen und anderem Getier auf der Kurischen Nehrung. Eichblatt: Leipzig. (In German)

References

External links 
 Biography (in German)

1863 births
1938 deaths
People from Sömmerda (district)
People from the Province of Saxony
German ornithologists